Reuven Firestone is an American academic and historian of religion, who serves as the Regenstein Professor in Medieval Judaism and Islam at the Hebrew Union College-Jewish Institute of Religion's Skirball Campus in Los Angeles and Affiliate Professor of Religion at the University of Southern California.

Biography
Firestone was born in Northern California and has lived with his family in Israel, Egypt, and Germany. He regularly lectures in universities and religious centers throughout the United States, Europe, the Middle East, and Asia. He has initiated and continues to be involved in numerous projects and initiatives which bring together Jews, Muslims, and Christians, Jews and Arabs, and Israelis and Palestinians.

Firestone earned his B.A. at Antioch College, his M.A. and Rabbinic ordination from the Hebrew Union College-Jewish Institute of Religion in 1982, and was awarded his Ph.D. in Arabic and Islamic studies from New York University in 1988. His scholarship focuses on Jewish studies, the Hebrew Bible and its exegesis, the Quran and its exegesis, Islamic–Jewish relations, religious phenomenology, comparative religion, and interfaith dialogue. He has researched and written extensively on the topics of religious violence and holy war in Islam and Judaism.

He is currently recipient of the Alexander von Humboldt Research Fellowship in Berlin and Sigi Feigel Visiting Professorship for Jewish Studies at the University of Zürich. He served as vice president of the Association for Jewish Studies (AJS) and president of the International Qur’anic Studies Association (IQSA).

Publications

. Translated into Turkish (2004): Yahudiliği Anlamak İbrahim'in / Avraam'ın Çocukları (Istanbul: GÖZLEM GAZETECİLİK BASIN VE YAYIN AŞ). Translated into Arabic (2005): ذرية إبراهيم: مقدمة عن اليهودية للمسلمين, Dhuriyat Ibrahim: Muqaddima `an al-Yahudiyya lil-Muslimin.

References

External links
HUC-JIR Faculty Page

20th-century Jewish biblical scholars
21st-century Jewish biblical scholars
American biblical scholars
American emigrants to Egypt
American emigrants to Germany
American emigrants to Israel
American Islamic studies scholars
American historians of religion
Antioch College alumni
Christian–Islamic–Jewish interfaith dialogue
Hebrew Union College – Jewish Institute of Religion alumni
Hebrew Union College – Jewish Institute of Religion faculty
Historians of Jews and Judaism
Islamic and Jewish interfaith dialogue
Jewish American historians
Jewish scholars of Islam
New York University alumni
American scholars of Islam
People in interfaith dialogue
Quranic exegesis scholars
University of Southern California faculty
Historians from California